The 2000 Yountville earthquake occurred with a moment magnitude of 5 on a previously unmapped fault, about  south southwest of Yountville, California in the Mayacamas Mountain Range under Mount Veeder and about  south northwest of Napa, California. It occurred at 01:36 PDT (08:36 UTC) on September 3.

Earthquake
The earthquake occurred at a depth of 9.4 km on a northwest-oriented fault and with a right-lateral strike-slip motion.  The epicenter of the earthquake was near the West Napa Fault, a previously unmarked fault.

Damage
Several unreinforced masonry buildings in downtown Napa suffered exterior damage as a result of the earthquake. Sixteen buildings were red tagged following the event and 168 were yellow tagged. Although the magnitude of the primary event was considered moderate, shaking was intensified in the city of Napa and surrounding area due to the sedimentary soil on the floor of the valley. The earthquake caused an interruption of power to approximately 10,000 Pacific Gas and Electric Company customers. Several hundred houses suffered toppled or cracked chimneys and several instances of broken plumbing due to toppled water heaters were reported. Transportation infrastructure in the affected area did not suffer any significant damage from the earthquake.

See also

 List of earthquakes in 2000
 List of earthquakes in California
 List of earthquakes in the United States

References

External links
 USGS The September 3, 2000 Yountville Earthquake
 USGS Shakemap

2000
2000 earthquakes
2000 in California
Geology of Napa County, California
History of Napa County, California
Mayacamas Mountains
Yountville, California
2000 natural disasters in the United States